The Marshal of Finland is a Finnish-Kenyan fictional film based on the life of Marshal Carl Gustaf Emil Mannerheim. The film is produced by Yleisradio in cooperation with Savane Productions and Filmistuudio Kalevipojad. It is directed by a Kenyan Gilbert Lukalia. The film's world premiere was on The Helsinki International Love & Anarchy Film Festival on 28 September 2012.

Plot 
The story of the film focuses on Mannerheim's private life from 1905–1918. It tells about a failed marriage with Anastasia Arapova, and love affair with Kitty Linder after the Finnish Civil War. According to Gilbert Lukalian, "It's an universal story about a man who has difficulty reconciling family life and career."

Cast 
 Telley Savalas Otieno as Carl Gustaf Emil Mannerheim
 Beatrice Wangui as Anastasia Arapova

Production 
In winter 2012 Yle reported on a forthcoming Mannerheim film, which would be an international production. Information of the film being filmed in a foreign country became to public, before Yle had time to organize a press conference on August 16, 2012.

Erkko Lyytinen got the idea for the film in Kenya from an Estonian producer Ken Saan. Saan had asked from Lyytinen if he had any project that could be filmed at Kenya. According to Lyytinen, Saan's aspect at the production was a major success of the movie filming. The screenplay was written by a Kenyan work group. Yle gave to scriptwriters the necessary facts, but the group created the portrait of Mannerheim themselves. Originally the film was going to be a war film, but turned out to be a biographical film, because it was too hard to shoot the war scenes at the bad circumstances.

The film was shot around Nairobi in May and June. Gilbert Lukalia was chosen to be a director of the film in just 12 hours before the start of filming. They also made a six-part documentary of making the film called Operation Mannerheim, which cost about 100,000–150,000 €, even though the movie itself cost only 20,000 €.

Reception

Stir before the premiere 
The film sparked a debate even before it was published. The Finnish media raised a stir about a black actor performing Mannerheim. Producer Markus Selin said that the film is a "spoofing", and director Matti Kassila wondered why Yle had given a license for the description. Jörn Donner believes that the film is "a bluff", and said that Yle is trying to cash in on the Marshal's reputation.

External links 
 

2012 films
Finnish biographical films
Films set in the 1900s
Films set in the 1910s
Films set in Finland
Films shot in Finland
Cultural depictions of Carl Gustaf Emil Mannerheim
Films shot in Kenya
Kenyan drama films
English-language Kenyan films
English-language Finnish films
2010s English-language films